Chaabi (lit. "popular") refers to several types of popular music of Morocco, combining rural and urban folk music.

The genre started out as street music performed in squares and souks, and can be heard in cafés, at restaurants and at weddings.

Rural varieties include Jerra and al-Aïta (lit. "the cry").

Several artists performing this genre are known, such as Hajib, Abdelaziz Stati, Najat Aatabou, Saïd Senhaji and Khalid Bennani.

References 

Moroccan styles of music